Shelly Shaurya (born 17 September 1993) is an Indian cricketer. He played four Twenty20 cricket matches for Delhi between 2013 and 2014. He made his List A debut for Manipur in the 2018–19 Vijay Hazare Trophy on 6 October 2018. He made his first-class debut for Manipur in the 2018–19 Ranji Trophy on 1 November 2018.

See also
 List of Delhi cricketers

References

External links
 

1993 births
Living people
Indian cricketers
Delhi cricketers
Manipur cricketers
Cricketers from Delhi